Biffeche or Bifeche is an area of Senegal centred on the town of Savoigne, around 30 kilometres north-east of the major coastal city of Saint-Louis.

Low-lying and largely flat, the region has Fula, Serer-Ndut people (the original founders of Biffeche and Mt Rolland, and strong  adherents to Serer religion, even after the French and the Muslim communities of Senegal  tried to kill them off), Wolof and Moor ethnic groups engaged in pasturing animals (mainly the Fulas) and irrigation-based agriculture (mostly the Serer-Ndut who are usually mixed-farmers). Savoigne is the region's largest town, twinned with La Ferté Macé; its SOCAS tomato-paste factory imports and dilutes tomato paste for re-shipment within Senegal. The population is primarily Muslim, but also contains Catholics and animists.  The Djoudj National Bird Sanctuary is located to the north.

Early European accounts used the word for a different location, describing a medium-sized island (Isle de Bifeche) in the delta of the Senegal River in West Africa,  some two miles upstream from the island of N'Dar on which Saint-Louis was founded. The Penny Cyclopædia of the Society for the Diffusion of Useful Knowledge described the island in 1843 as being "entirely covered with wood, and in the wet season a great portion of them is laid under water."

In the 17th century a chief known as the Petit Brak or Little King ruled over a region known variously as Biffeche or Gangueul with capital at Maka.  The Grand Brak or Big King ruled the kingdom of Waalo, whose capital was originally at Diourbel. The area was nearly depopulated by repeated slaving raids by Moors from the north.  At times, the Petit Brak was tributary to Waalo, at other times allied with Bethio. In the 1720s, the Brak of Waalo was Erim M'Bagnick and Béquio Malicouri, king of the Royaume d'Oral (Bethio), was his vassal.

Notes

References

General
Barry, Boubacar.  Le royaume du Waalo - Le Senegal avant la conquete. Karthala, 1985.
Becker, Charles and Martin, Victor.  Journal Historique et Suitte du Journal Historique (1729-1731) 39.2 (1977): 223–289.   Wayback Machine
Cultru, Prosper.  Premier voyage du Sieur de la Courbe.... Paris: Larose, 1913.
Encyclopedie, dictionnaire raisonné des sciences, des arts et des métiers, par une société de gens de lettres, mis en ordre et publié par Mr. * * *, tome quinzieme. Neufchastel, France: Samuel Faulche, 1765. Facsimile page
Knight, Charles. The Penny Cyclopædia of the Society for the Diffusion of Useful Knowledge, Vol. XXI. London, 1843: 231. Public domain copy
Labat, Jean-Baptiste.  Nouvelle Relation de l’Afrique occidentale.  Paris: Cavelier, 1727. t. 2, p. 174.
Thésée, Françoise. Actes du colloque de Nantes, tome I. 1988. 223–245. population afrique.
Thilmans, Guy. Bull. Les planches sénégalaises et mauritaniennes des “Atlas Vingboons” , G. IFAN, B. t. 37.1 (1975): 106–109.
Gravrand, Henry, "La civilisation Sereer - Cosaan : les origines, vol.1, pp 140-146, Nouvelles Editions Africaines, 1983, 
Echenberg, Myron J, "Black death, white medicine: bubonic plague and the politics of public health in colonial Senegal, 1914-1945", pp 141–146, Heinemann (2002), 
Klein, Martin A., "Islam and Imperialism in Senegal, Sine-Saloum", pp VII-5, Edinburgh University Press, (1968), 
Dupire, Marguerite, "Sagesse sereer: Essais sur la pensée sereer ndut", Sagesse sereer: essais sur la pensée sereer ndut
Becker, Charles, "Les Serer Ndut: Études sur les mutations sociales et religieuses", Microéditions Hachette (1974)

Historical maps 
Cours de la rivière de Sanaga ou Sénégal depuis son embouchure jusqu'à l'île de Bilbas / Suite du cours de la rivière de Sénégal depuis l'isle de Bilbas jusqu'au sault du Rocherde Govina / levé par un ingénieur francois, 1718. Online at BNF
Carte de la rivière du Sénégal depuis la Barre jusqu'au Panier Foule des petites rivières et marigots qui en dérivent avec les noms des villages qui sont au bord, fait au Sénégal, 1720. Online at BNF
Anville, Jean-Baptiste Bourguignon, Carte manuscrite de la côte d'Afrique aux environs de Gorée et de la rivière du Sénégal depuis Cagneux jusqu'à son embouchure. 1724. Online at BNF

External links 
Google Maps satellite image of the Senegal River delta
Area Map
History (in French)
Ethnicity (in French)
Religion (in French)
Senegalese History and Geography (mainly in French)
Horticulture (in French)
Parc du Djoudj
 Indigenous chief Béquio Malicouri

Regions of West Africa by country
Regions of Senegal
Serer country
Serer precolonial kingdoms
Biffeche
Biffeche
Biffeche (Region of Senegal)
Biffeche
Biffeche
Countries in precolonial Africa